David White is an Australian sound editor best known for his role as the sound designer of the 2015 film Mad Max: Fury Road. White won the Academy Award for Best Sound Editing for the 2015 film  Mad Max: Fury Road with fellow sound editor Mark Mangini.

Filmography 
 Snow Monkey (2015) ... Sound mixer 
 Mad Max: Fury Road  (2015) ... Sound designer 
 Inside Out (2013) (Short) ... Sound mixer
 Love City, Jalalabad (2013) ... Sound editor
 The Road Home (2013) (Short) ... Sound editor
 Happy Feet Two (2011) ... Sound design
 Wild Planet (Redux) (2010) ... Sound editor / sound mixer 
 Orchids, My Intersex Adventure (2010) ... Sound mixer
 Policing the Pacific  (2007) ... Sound mixer
 Farscape: The Peacekeeper Wars (2004) (TV Mini-Series) ... Supervising sound editor
 Farscape (1999-2001) (TV Series)... Supervising sound editor

Awards and recognitions

References

External links

Australian sound editors
Living people
Year of birth missing (living people)
Place of birth missing (living people)
Best Sound Editing Academy Award winners